macOS High Sierra (version 10.13) is the fourteenth major release of macOS, Apple Inc.'s desktop operating system for Macintosh computers. macOS High Sierra was announced at the WWDC 2017 on June 5, 2017 and was released on September 25, 2017. The name "High Sierra" refers to the High Sierra region in California. Its name signified its goal to be a refinement of the previous macOS version, macOS Sierra, focused on performance improvements and technical updates rather than features. This makes it similar to previous macOS releases Snow Leopard, Mountain Lion and El Capitan. Among the apps with notable changes are Photos and Safari.

System requirements
When macOS High Sierra was released, it supported all Macs that can run macOS Sierra:
iMac (Late 2009 or later)
MacBook (Late 2009 or later)
MacBook Air (Late 2010 or later)
MacBook Pro (Mid 2010 or later)
Mac Mini (Mid 2010 or later)
Mac Pro (Mid 2010 or later)

Macs that were released after High Sierra was released, with High Sierra as the initial operating major release, are:

iMac Pro (2017)

macOS High Sierra requires at least 2 GB of RAM and 20.12 GB of available disk space.

It is possible to install High Sierra on many older Macintosh computers that are not officially supported by Apple. This requires using a patch to modify the install image.

Changes

System

Apple File System
Apple File System (APFS) replaces HFS Plus as the default file system in macOS for the first time with High Sierra. It supports 64‑bit inode numbers, is designed for flash memory, and is designed to speed up common tasks like duplicating a file and finding the size of a folder's contents. It also has built‑in encryption, crash‑safe protections, and simplified data backup on the go.

Metal 2
Metal, Apple's low-level graphics API, has been updated to Metal 2. It includes virtual-reality and machine-learning features, as well as support for external GPUs. The system's windowing system, Quartz Compositor, supports Metal 2.

Media
macOS High Sierra adds support for High Efficiency Video Coding (HEVC), with hardware acceleration where available, as well as support for High Efficiency Image File Format (HEIF). Macs with the Intel Kaby Lake processor offer hardware support for Main 10 profile 10-bit hardware decoding, those with the Intel Skylake processor support Main profile 8-bit hardware decoding, and those with AMD Radeon 400 series graphics also support full HEVC decoding. However, whenever an Intel IGP is present, the frameworks will only direct requests to Intel IGP. In addition, audio codecs FLAC and Opus are also supported, but not in iTunes.

HEVC hardware acceleration requires a Mac with a sixth-generation Intel processor or newer (late 2015 27-inch iMac, mid 2017 21.5-inch iMac, early 2016 MacBook, late 2016 MacBook Pro or iMac Pro).

Other
Kernel extensions ("kexts") will require explicit approval by the user before being able to run.

The Low Battery notification and its icon were replaced by a flatter modern look.

The time service ntpd was replaced with timed for the time synchronization.

The FTP and telnet command line programs were removed.

Caching Server, File Sharing Server, and Time Machine Server, features that were previously part of macOS Server, are now provided as part of the OS.

The screen can now be locked using the shortcut Cmd+Ctrl+Q. The ability to lock screen using a menu bar shortcut activated in Keychain Access preferences has now been removed.

The 10.13.4 update added support for external graphics processors for Macs equipped with Thunderbolt 3 ports. The update discontinued support for external graphics processors in 2015 or older Macs, equipped with Thunderbolt 1 and 2 ports.

Starting with 10.13.4, when a 32-bit app is opened, users get a one-time warning about its future incompatibility with the macOS operating system.

Applications

Final Cut Pro 7
Apple announced the original Final Cut Studio suite of programs will not work on High Sierra. Media professionals that depend on any of those programs were advised to create a double boot drive to their computer.

Photos
macOS High Sierra gives Photos an updated sidebar and new editing tools.
Photos synchronizes tagged People with iOS 11.

Mail
Mail has improved Spotlight search with Top Hits. Mail also uses 35% less storage space due to optimizations, and Mail's compose window can now be used in split-screen mode.

Safari
macOS High Sierra includes Safari 11. Safari 11 has a new "Intelligent Tracking Prevention" feature that uses machine learning to block third parties from tracking the user's actions. Safari can also block auto playing videos from playing. The "Reader Mode" can be set to always-on. Safari 11 also supports WebAssembly. The last version of Safari that High Sierra supports is 13.1.2. This version has known security issues.

Notes
The Notes app includes the ability to add tables to notes, and notes can be pinned to the top of the list. The version number was incremented to 4.5.

Siri
Siri now uses a more natural and expressive voice. It also uses machine learning to understand the user better. Siri synchronizes information across iOS and Mac devices so the Siri experience is the same regardless of the product being used.

Messages
The release of macOS High Sierra 10.13.5 (and iOS 11.4) introduced support for Messages in iCloud. This feature allows messages to sync across all devices using the same iCloud account. When messages are deleted they are deleted on each device as well, and messages stored in the cloud do not take up local storage on the device anymore. In order to use the feature, the user has to enable two-factor authentication for their Apple ID.

Reception
In his September 2017 review of High Sierra, Roman Loyola, the senior editor of Macworld, gave it a provisionally positive review, calling it an "incremental update worthy of your time, eventually." Loyola expressed that the product's most significant draw was its security features, and that beyond this, the most beneficial changes lay in its future potential, saying it "doesn't have a lot of new features that will widen your eyes in excitement. But a lot of the changes are in the background and under the hood, and they lay a foundation for better things to come."

Problems
macOS High Sierra 10.13.0 and 10.13.1 have a critical vulnerability that allowed an attacker to become a root user by entering "root" as a username, and not entering a password, when logging in. This was fixed in the Security Update 2017-001 for macOS High Sierra v10.13.1.

When it was first launched, it was discovered that the WindowServer process had a memory leak, leading to much slower graphics performance and lagging animations, probably due to some last-minute changes in Metal 2. This was fixed in macOS 10.13.1.

macOS High Sierra 10.13.4 had an error that caused DisplayLink to stop working for external monitors, allowing only one monitor to be extended. When using two external monitors, they could only be mirrored. Alban Rampon, the Senior Product Manager for DisplayLink, stated on December 24, 2018 that the company was working with Apple to resolve the issue.

Release history

Timeline of Mac operating systems

References

External links
 – official site
macOS High Sierra download page at Apple

13
X86-64 operating systems
2017 software
Computer-related introductions in 2017